Bacone College, formerly Bacone Indian University, is a private tribal college in Muskogee, Oklahoma. Founded in 1880 as the Indian University by missionary Almon C. Bacone, it was originally affiliated with the mission arm of what is now American Baptist Churches USA. Renamed as Bacone College in the early 20th century, it is the oldest continuously operated institution of higher education in Oklahoma. The liberal arts college has had strong historic ties to several tribal nations, including the Muscogee and Cherokee. The Bacone College Historic District has been on the National Register of Historic Places listings in Muskogee County, Oklahoma since 2014.

In 2018, the college was struggling financially. Several tribal nations agreed that year to a consortium and chartered it as a tribal college. This action secured federal funding under the government's treaty obligations to support Native American education. The college's current president is Dr. Ferlin Clark (Navajo Nation), a graduate of the University of Arizona.

History

Some accounts credit Almon C. Bacone, a missionary teacher in Cherokee Nation, Indian Territory, with asking the American Baptist Home Mission Society for support to start a school in the Cherokee Baptist Mission at their capital, Tahlequah in 1867. Bacone had previously taught at the Cherokee Male Seminary established in Indian Territory.

According to historian John Bartlett Meserve, Bacone College can be traced to a Baptist mission school at Valley Town in western North Carolina, which was part of Cherokee homelands. Evan Jones, one of the earliest missionaries to the Cherokee, led the school. After most of the Cherokee were removed to Indian Territory in the late 1830s, the Valley Town school moved to a site near what developed as present-day Westville, Oklahoma.

In 1867, Evan Jones' son, John B. Jones, moved the school to Talequah in the Cherokee Nation. In 1885 the mission school moved to Muskogee, Creek Nation, and changed its name to Bacone, after its first teacher.

When Bacone College was founded (at the time more of a seminary or academy in curriculum level) in 1867, Almon C Bacone was the sole faculty and three students were enrolled. By the end of the first semester, students had increased to 12.  By the end of the first year, the student population was 56 and the faculty numbered three.

Bacone appealed to the Muscogee Creek Nation's Tribal Council to donate  (a section) of land for the college in nearby Muskogee. It was the capital of the Creek Nation, and informally known as the "Indian Capital of the World". The Nation granted the land to Bacone and the Baptists.

In 1885 Indian University was moved to a new building at its present site in Muskogee. It continued to develop here. In 1910, it was renamed Bacone College, after its founder and first president.

Conversion to tribal college 
In the spring of 2018, the college struggled with severe financial difficulties. It began to lay off most employees following commencement and reported that it needed an immediate infusion of $2 million in order to continue to operate: to complete the 2018–2019 academic year and to open in the fall of 2019. The school reopened after cutting programs, reducing the number of faculty, and selling property. Among the properties sold was Bacone Commons, for $2.85 million as part of the college's 2018-2019 financial restructuring.

The tribal nations in Oklahoma collaborated to take over control of the college as a consortium to revive its history as a tribal college established for Indian education. The tribes would be able to control education of their students and the arrangement would enable them to secure federal funding from the Bureau of Indian Education (in the BIA) as part of the government's treaty responsibilities to educate American Indian students.

The United Keetoowah Band of Cherokee Indians approved a charter agreement in April 2019. In July 2019, the Osage Nation announced that it would charter the school as a tribal college.  In August 2019 the Otoe-Missouria Tribe of Indians also agreed to charter the college. The Cheyenne and Arapaho Tribes approved a charter in September, and the Kiowa Tribe in February 2020.  (The Muscogee (Creek) Nation chartered its own College of the Muscogee Nation.)

Campus

One of the first buildings to be erected was Rockefeller Hall, a three-story building made possible by a $10,000 contribution from philanthropist John D. Rockefeller.  "Old Rock," as it came to be called, served as classroom, dormitory, dining hall, chapel, teacher quarters and administration building. It was razed in 1938 and a Memorial Chapel was built in its place.  That was destroyed by fire but it was reconstructed in the 1990s.  The historic buildings of the campus contribute to the Bacone College Historic District, which was listed on the National Register of Historic Places in 2014.

The campus contains many other reminders of Bacone's history, tradition, and goals.  One of these is a small cemetery, the final resting place of Bacone presidents Almon C. Bacone (1880–1896) and Benjamin D. Weeks (1918–1941), as well as others associated with the school. A "stone bible" sculpture marks the spot on which President Bacone and Joseph Samuel Murrow and Daniel Rogers, two Baptist missionaries and trustees, knelt in prayer to dedicate the college. The names of all the  college's presidents are inscribed on its surface.

Other structures on campus include The Indian Room at the Bacone College Library, which holds many of the papers of Almon C. Bacone; the Ataloa Lodge Museum, which has a Native American art collection; and the McCombs Gallery, which features a large cross-section of Native American art. This includes artwork by Richard "Dick" West (Southern Cheyenne), an alumnus, former director of the art department and professor emeritus. This artist is best known for his traditional Plains-style artwork. The gallery also holds work by Woody Crumbo (Citizen Potawatomi), the only American Indian to receive a Julius Rosenwald Fellowship. Collectively, the modernist Flatstyle painting movement developed by Blue Eagle, Crumbo, West, and others is known as the Bacone school.

In 2011 Bacone College acquired the Northpointe Shopping Center, which it renamed the Bacone Commons. The college moved the campus library and important offices there.

Centers
Bacone College has three centers to help fulfill its historic mission of American Indian and Christian education.

Center for American Indians:
 Preservation of the American Indian Collections at Bacone College.
 Coordination of American Indian degrees and cultural programs.
 Research related to the future of American Indian education and collections in higher education.
Center for Christian Ministry:
The broad umbrella for spiritual life on campus that helps the college to fulfill its mission as a four-year liberal arts college affiliated with the American Baptist Churches.
Center for Church Relations:
As Baptist churches support the college with students and scholarships, this center develops leaders for evangelization. It also provides training to non-traditional learners through online and off-campus education, assisting churches in their growth, providing music and preaching/teaching ministry to churches for special events, and continuing education for church leaders.

Indian Art Program
Initiated by Mary “Ataloa” Stone McLendon after her arrival at Bacone in 1927, the Bacone Indian Art Program became nationally known for its association with respected Native American artists such as W. “Dick” West, Acee Blue Eagle and Woody Crumbo.  It fostered that school of Native American art that came to be known as the ‘’Bacone style”.  The college possesses the Ataloa Lodge Museum, built in 1932 and housing more than 20,000 pieces of traditional and contemporary Native American art, including the largest collection of Kachina dolls in the country.  In January, 2022, the college officially opened the VanBuren Sunshine Gallery, being exhibition space in McCombs Hall used to display new student art.

Athletics
The Bacone athletic teams are called the Warriors. The university is a member of the National Association of Intercollegiate Athletics (NAIA), primarily competing as an NAIA Independent within the Continental Athletic Conference since the 2019–20 academic year. The Warriors previously competed in the Sooner Athletic Conference (SAC) from 2015–16 to 2018–19; and in the Red River Athletic Conference (RRAC) from 1998–99 to 2014–15. The Bacone football team competed in the Central States Football League (CSFL) until the sport was discontinued after the 2018 fall season (2018–19 academic year).

Bacone competes in 11 intercollegiate varsity sports: Men's sports include baseball, basketball, cross country, golf and soccer; while women's sports include basketball, cross country, golf, soccer, softball and volleyball. Former sports included football, wrestling, and rodeo.

Baseball
The Bacone baseball team won the Junior College World Series in 1967; a school with total enrollment of 250 competed with schools that had over 20,000. They were led by coach Enos Semore, who  went on to coach at Oklahoma for 23 years.

Decline
Because of financial difficulties, in 2018 Bacone dropped its football, volleyball, golf, wrestling and rodeo teams. After several tribes agreed to charter the college in 2019 and ensure its survival, the college reopened.

Return
As of February 2020, the college has the following sponsored sports returned: men's and women's basketball, baseball and softball, men's and women's soccer, and men's and women's cross country teams.

Notable people

Administration and staff
Dean Chavers (Lumbee), President 1978-81

Alumni
 Jimmy Anderson (Muscogee), artist, musician and preacher
 Thomas Banyacya (Hopi), traditionalist and activist
 Don Chandler, class of 1954, professional football player
 Eddie Chuculate (Muscogee/Cherokee), author
 Adee Dodge (Navajo), linguist, painter, Navajo code-talker
 Franklin Gritts (Cherokee Nation), artist and art director of the Sporting News
 Enoch Kelly Haney (Seminole/Muscogee), Class of 1962. Politician, artist, and sculptor
 Sharron Ahtone Harjo (Kiowa), artist and educator
 Patrick J. Hurley, soldier, statesman, and diplomat
 Edward E. McClish, soldier and guerrilla leader in the Philippines during World War II. 
 Joseph Medicine Crow (High Bird) (Crow), tribal historian, author, and war chief
 Jack C. Montgomery (Cherokee), World War II Medal of Honor recipient
 Alexander Posey (Muscogee), writer and humorist
 Daniel Roberts, NAIA All-American wrestler; professional mixed martial artist for the UFC
 Willard Stone, sculptor, attended Bacone, later received honorary degree
 Tyler Thomas, Canadian Football League player
 David E. Williams (Kiowa/Tonkawa/Kiowa Apache) artist
Timothy Hill American professional baseball pitcher for the San Diego Padres

Faculty
 Acee Blue Eagle (Muscogee Creek), artist, Art Department Director, 1935–1938
 Woody Crumbo (Citizen Potawatomi), artist, Art Department Director, 1938–1941 and 1943–1945
 Ruthe Blalock Jones (Shawnee/Peoria), painter and printmaker, Art Department Director
 Mary Stone McLendon (Chickasaw) educator, storyteller, and musician, founder of the Art Department and first director, 1932–1935.
 Enos Semore, baseball, basketball, track, PE and intramural coach; head baseball coach Oklahoma 1968–89
 W. Richard West Sr. (Southern Cheyenne), painter and sculptor, Art Department Director, 1947–1970

See also
National Register of Historic Places listings in Muskogee County, Oklahoma

References

Further reading
 Lisa K. Neuman, Indian Play: Indigenous Identities at Bacone College. Lincoln, NE: University of Nebraska Press, 2013.

External links 
 
 Official athletics website

 
Educational institutions established in 1880
Private universities and colleges in Oklahoma
OK Cooperative Alliance
Sooner Athletic Conference
Universities and colleges affiliated with the American Baptist Churches USA
Education in Muskogee County, Oklahoma
Buildings and structures in Muskogee, Oklahoma
Native American boarding schools
1880 establishments in Indian Territory
Tourist attractions in Muskogee, Oklahoma